A spokestoon is an established cartoon character who is hired to endorse a product. It should not be equated with a cartoon character invented specifically to give identity to a product, such as the Michelin Man, Speedy Alka-Seltzer or the Pillsbury Doughboy. For these and more, see List of advertising characters.

When the United States entered World War II, well-known celebrities already highly placed in American popular culture, such as Donald Duck and Bugs Bunny, joined the war effort, donating their highly visible images   for patriotic and informative cartoons. Bambi, loaned by Walt Disney for one year (1943) to the US Forest Service, was the precursor of the purposely-created Smokey.

Toons have also lent their celebrity to individual events, such as Pogo for Earth Day in 1970, or The Smurfs to UNICEF in 2005.

Since then, many high-profile celebrities toons have turned their skills to corporate product placement.  Though fast food franchises have used gimmicks to tie-in temporarily with current releases of animated features since the 1950s, a few toons have become more permanently associated with a product or service offered by corporate culture and may be considered genuine spokestoons.

Early recorded usages of the term "spokestoon" include a March 25, 1995, feature in the Portland, Maine Press Herald, noting "Buster Brown, the comic strip character who became the 'spokestoon' for the children's shoe line", and an October 1995 article about the Disney Corporation's use of characters from The Lion King to promote good nutrition in children.<ref>Washington Post news story, "Disney School Lunch `Spokestoons' Leave Lawmaker With Sour Taste,"  October 9, 1995.</ref>

Examples of spokestoons and the products they are identified with:

Dennis the Menace for Dairy Queen until 2002.
Donald Duck for Donald Duck orange juice
Fred Flintstone and Barney Rubble for Winston cigarettes, Post's Fruity Pebbles, Cocoa Pebbles and Cinnamon Pebbles breakfast cereals, and Flintstones vitamins
Little Lulu for Kleenex
Bugs Bunny for Tang and Weetabix
Gumby for CheeriosPeanuts characters for the Ford Falcon car, Dolly Madison snacks, and Metropolitan Life Insurance
Mickey Mouse for Disney Mickey's Magix breakfast cereal
The Pink Panther for Owens Corning fiberglass thermal insulation, and Sweet'N Low artificial sweetener
The Road Runner for Time Warner's Road Runner internet service and AutoNationRocky and Bullwinkle characters for Family Fun Center, General Mills, and Taco BellThe Simpsons characters for Nestlé's Butterfinger candy bars and Procter & Gamble's Vizir laundry detergent Underdog characters for Family Fun CenterWinnie the Pooh characters for Disney Hunny B's Honey-Graham breakfast cerealYogi Bear characters for Yogi Bear Toastee Tarts Toaster tartHuey, Dewey & Louie'' for Nestle's Trio

References

Animated characters
Advertising
Mascots